Neighborhoods in Washington, D.C., are distinguished by their history, culture, architecture, demographics, and geography. The names of 131 neighborhoods are unofficially defined by the D.C. Office of Planning. Neighborhoods can be defined by the boundaries of wards, historic districts, Advisory Neighborhood Commissions, civic associations, and business improvement districts (BIDs); these boundaries will overlap. The eight wards each elect a member to the Council of the District of Columbia and are redistricted every ten years. 

As the capital of the United States, Washington's local neighborhood history and culture is often presented as being distinct from that of the national government.

List of neighborhoods by ward

Ward 1

Ward 1 Councilmember: Brianne Nadeau
Population (2021): 91,673

Adams Morgan
Columbia Heights
Howard University
Kalorama
LeDroit Park
Lanier Heights
Mount Pleasant
Park View
Pleasant Plains
Shaw (Parts of the neighborhood are also in Ward 2 and Ward 6)
U Street Corridor (Part of the neighborhood is also in Ward 2)

Ward 2

Ward 2 Councilmember: Brooke Pinto
Population (2021): 92,809

Burleith
Chinatown
Downtown
Dupont Circle
Federal Triangle
Foggy Bottom
Georgetown
Logan Circle
Mount Vernon Square (Part of the neighborhood is also in Ward 6)
Penn Quarter
Shaw (Parts of the neighborhood are also in Ward 1 and Ward 6)
Sheridan Kalorama
Southwest Federal Center
U Street Corridor (Part of the neighborhood is also in Ward 1)
West End

Ward 3

Ward 3 Councilmember: Matthew Frumin
Population (2021): 84,979

American University Park
Berkley
Cathedral Heights
Chevy Chase
Cleveland Park
Colony Hill
Forest Hills
Foxhall
Friendship Heights
Glover Park
Kent
Massachusetts Heights
McLean Gardens
North Cleveland Park
Observatory Circle
The Palisades
Potomac Heights
Spring Valley
Tenleytown
Wakefield
Wesley Heights
Woodland Normanstone
Woodley Park 
Woodmont

Ward 4

Ward 4 Councilmember: Janeese Lewis George
Population (2021): 87,150

Barnaby Woods
Brightwood
Brightwood Park
Chevy Chase (Part of the neighborhood is also in Ward 3)
Colonial Village
Crestwood
Fort Totten
Hawthorne
Manor Park
Petworth
Riggs Park (also known as Lamond Riggs)
Shepherd Park
Sixteenth Street Heights
Takoma

Ward 5

Ward 5 Councilmember: Zachary Parker
Population (2021): 90,380

Arboretum
Bloomingdale
Brentwood
Brookland
Carver Langston
Eckington
Edgewood
Fort Lincoln
Fort Totten
Gateway
Ivy City
Langdon
Michigan Park
North Michigan Park
Pleasant Hill
Queens Chapel
Riggs Park (Part of the neighborhood is also in Ward 4)
Stronghold
Trinidad
Truxton Circle
Woodridge

Ward 6

Ward 6 Councilmember: Charles Allen
Population (2021): 103,197

Barney Circle
Capitol Hill
Judiciary Square
Kingman Park
Mount Vernon Triangle
Navy Yard
Near Northeast
NoMa
 Shaw
Southwest Waterfront
Sursum Corda
Swampoodle (Neighborhood from the 1850s to the 1910s replaced in large part today by NoMa and Near Northeast)

Ward 7

Ward 7 Councilmember: Vincent C. Gray
Population (2021): 80,669

Benning
Benning Heights
Benning Ridge
Burrville
Capitol View
Central Northeast
Civic Betterment
Deanwood
Dupont Park
East Corner
East River Heights
Eastland Gardens
Fairfax Village
Fort Davis
Fort Dupont
Fort Stanton
Good Hope
Greenway
Hillbrook
Hillcrest
Hill East
Kenilworth
Lincoln Heights
Marshall Heights
Mayfair
Naylor Gardens
Northeast Boundary
Penn Branch
Randle Highlands
River Terrace
Twining

Ward 8

Ward 8 Councilmember: Trayon White
Population (2021): 80,517

Anacostia
Barry Farm
Bellevue
Buena Vista
Congress Heights
Douglass
Fairlawn
Garfield Heights
Knox Hill
Park Naylor
Shipley Terrace
Skyland
Washington Highlands
Woodland

References

External links

 External link to D.C. neighborhood websites
 DC Genealogical Database
 National Capital Planning Commission
 D.C. Guide
 Washington DC, street by street (historic and modern photographs)
 Street map of Ward 4. Office of Councilmember Muriel Bowser.